John Madden Football is a football video game originally released for the Apple II, in 1988 following the success of Earl Weaver Baseball. It was later ported to MS-DOS and the Commodore 64. It was followed by the 1990 Sega Genesis video game of same name, and went on to become the yearly Madden NFL game series. It is sometimes called Madden '88 or Madden '89 to distinguish it from later games in the series.

This game features many customizable aspects including conditions, time of quarters, player fatigue, player injuries, and penalties. Unlike future Madden games, this version does not feature season play. It has only single games, and no actual NFL teams are included due to the lack of NFL or NFLPA licenses for authentic teams, player names, and stadiums. However, some teams are based on real teams. One could also create a team from scratch in this game. The cover was also used on All-Madden Edition of Madden NFL 23 and was made by Chuck Styles.

Development
Inspired by Strat-O-Matic Sports simulator games, Trip Hawkins had long wanted to make a football game. Joe Montana and Joe Kapp were initially approached in 1982 to endorse it, but both refused—Montana was already working with Atari on a rival football game while Kapp proved to be outside of the company's budget. He eventually approached John Madden two years later and the company hatched out an agreement. Madden was interested in the prospect of the resulting project being used as a teaching tool.

One sticking point for Madden was that 11 players had to be on each team, which was difficult due to technical limitations. EA had initially proposed that the game be played between two teams of six or seven, however Madden refused to endorse such a game. Due in part to this, as well as a legal issue involving Bethesda Softworks-whom EA hired to work on parts of the game, the development eventually took three years. At the time among the company the title became known as "Trip's Folly", with both employees of EA as well as Madden assuming that the game would be cancelled.

Reception
Computer Gaming World favorably reviewed John Madden Football for providing both a simple "Quick Mode" of arcade-like play, and a deeper "Standard Game" with detailed player statistics and user-created plays.

References

External links
 
 

1988 video games
Madden NFL
Electronic Arts games
Commodore 64 games
Commodore 128 games
Apple II games
Sega Genesis games
DOS games
EA Sports games
Multiplayer and single-player video games
Video games developed in the United States